Ada Fighiera-Sikorska or Ada Sikorska (26 January 1929 – 7 August 1996) was a Polish Esperantist. She edited the leading newspaper in Esperanto for thirty years. A was a member of the World Association of Esperanto Journalists (TEĴA), the Union of Esperanto Speakers Writers (EVA), the Esperanto PEN Club and an honorary member of the World Esperanto Association (UEA).

Life
Fighiera-Sikorska was born in Siedlce in 1929, but brought up in Warsaw. When World War II started in 1939 she and her family fled to Lviv, where her father, General Franciszek Sikorski organized the city's defense. After the defeat her family was sent to Siberia. Her father was among the 10,000 Polish officers who were murdered in the Katyn massacre.

In 1941 the USSR freed two million Polish civilians interned in Siberia. In 1942 Ada, with her mother and sister, could go through Samarkand to Tehran, and then to Isfahan, where she went to the Polish school. Between 1945 and January 1948 she lived with other Polish refugees in Beirut; in 1948 she passed the Polish Matura exam in Great Britain. In November she returned to Poland after eight years of absence.

She graduated in Slavic studies, specializing in journalism, at the University of Warsaw before starting her first job in a publishing house. In 1956 she participated in Esperanto language courses in Warsaw lead by Julio Baghy.

In 1958, before the jubilee World Esperanto Congress in Warsaw, she became the vice president of the Warsaw Esperanto Society and a member of the Esperanto editorial office of the Polish Radio. She then met her future husband, who was a member of the Standing Congress Committee (Konstancja Kongres Kongato) preparing the congress. In 1960, she married Gian Carlo Fighier in Brussels. A year later she worked with him to organize the World Esperanto Congress in Harrogate.

In 1962, Fighiera-Sikorska took over the Esperanto magazine Heroldo de Esperanto, which she edited for 36 years until her death: The magazine was published for seventeen years in Brussels, then for nine years in Madrid and finally, from 1988, in Turin. She participated in international, national and regional congresses and meetings of Esperanto as a teacher and lecturer.

Ada died at the age of 67 in Turin from an incurable spine and liver disease. At her request, the body was cremated. Her ashes are stored in the columbarium of the main cemetery in Turin.

References

1929 births
1996 deaths
People from Siedlce
Polish Esperantists
Polish refugees
World War II refugees
Polish magazine editors
Women magazine editors
Polish women writers
University of Warsaw alumni